Jeanne You, also You Ji-yeoun, (born August 23, 1978 in Yeosu) is a South Korean classical pianist.

Education and professional career
She began studying the piano at the age of five. After attending Yewon Art School in Seoul she became a student of Laszlo Simon at the Berlin University of the Arts and continued her studies with Klaus Bäßler and Georg Sava at the 
Hochschule für Musik Hanns Eisler. In 2005 she graduated with the degree of "Konzertexamen". She attended masterclasses with 
Daniel Barenboim, Dietrich Fischer-Dieskau, Klaus Hellwig, Hans Leygraf, Menahem Pressler, and  Eliso Virsaladze. She teaches piano at the Hochschule für Musik "Carl Maria von Weber" (since 2006) in Dresden and in addition since 2009 at the Berlin University of the Arts.

Awards 
1995: 2nd Prize, Göttingen International Chopin Competition 
1997: 4th Prize, Konzerteum International Piano Competition
2000: 3rd Prize, 51st Viotti International Music Competition
2001: 3rd Prize, 8th International Johannes Brahms Competition  
2004: 1st Prize, 2nd Berlin Pianoforte Competition
2004: 1st Prize, International Young Musicians Platform Bromsgrove

Performing career
Jeanne You has performed widely in Germany, the UK and Korea. In 2007 she appeared in the Salle Gaveau in Paris, in 2006 at the  Musica Nova Festival in Glasgow and in 2005 at the Bolzano Piano Festival. In summer 2007 she performed Fantasies and Dances of the 19th century virtuoso  Charles Voss at his birthplace in Schmarsow, Mecklenburg-Vorpommern.

External links 
Homepage of J.You
entry at HfM Hanns Eisler
 entry at International Johannes Brahms Competition 2001
entry in World Federation of International Music Competitions,Geneva
entry at the Bolzano Piano Festival 2004
 entry at 2. Berlin Pianoforte Competition
International Young Musicians Platform Bromsgrove
homepage at Hochschule für Musik Carl Maria von Weber Dresden
homepage at Universität der Künste Berlin

1978 births
Living people
South Korean classical pianists
South Korean women pianists
Academic staff of the Hochschule für Musik Carl Maria von Weber
21st-century pianists
Women classical pianists
21st-century women pianists